"Danse" (English: "Dance") is a 2010 song recorded by French singer-songwriter Grégoire and produced by Franck Authié under My Major Company label. It was the first single from his second album Le Même Soleil and was released in September 2010.

Charts

References

2010 singles
Grégoire (musician) songs
Songs written by Grégoire (musician)
2010 songs